Ingøya is an island on the edge of the Arctic Ocean in Måsøy Municipality in Troms og Finnmark county, Norway. The  island lies just north of the island of Rolvsøya and west of the island of Hjelmsøya. The sparsely populated island is only accessible by boat. 

There are regular ferry connections at the port in the village of Ingøy on the north side of the island. The ferry connects to Gunnarnes on Rolvsøya and Havøysund on the island of Havøya. The island has about 13 inhabitants (2022). Fruholmen Lighthouse lies just off the northern coast of the island.

From the northwest, the broad Mafjorden cuts into the island of Ingøya and on the east side there is an open bay called Sanden. 

The southern and eastern parts of the island are flat and partially swampy. The northern part is a more mountainous part where the fishing village of Ingøy is located. Ingøy Church is located in Ingøy village. Historically, Mafjorden, Gåsnes, and Ingøy were all large fishing villages. There were two whaling stations located in Mafjorden that operated until the early 20th century.

See also
List of islands of Norway

References

External links 
 Information and pictures from Ingøy
 Ingoy LW 153 kHz 1EN

Måsøy
Islands of Troms og Finnmark